Ulrich Lemmer (born May 1964) is a German electrical engineer and professor specializing in optoelectronics.

Education 
Ulrich Lemmer received a diploma degree in physics from RWTH Aachen University in 1990 and a Ph.D. from the University of Marburg in 1995. From 1995 to 1996, he held a postdoctoral position with the University of California at Santa Barbara.

Career 
In 2002, Lemmer was appointed as a full Professor and director of the Light Technology Institute, Karlsruhe Institute of Technology. He is also one of the directors of the Institute for Microstructure Technology. To appreciate his work for the optics society Lemmer was awarded with the Esther Hoffman Beller Medal in 2018.

Publications 
Lemmer is an author of over 400 journal publications, 17 patents or patent applications, and 9 books and book articles.

References 

German physicists
RWTH Aachen University alumni
University of Marburg alumni
Academic staff of the Karlsruhe Institute of Technology
1964 births
Living people